Appula Appa Rao  is a 1992 Telugu-language comedy film, produced by B. Suresh under the Kamadhenu Creations banner, presented by Rama Prabha and directed by E. V. V. Satyanarayana. It stars Rajendra Prasad, Shobana and music composed by Rajan–Nagendra. The film was recorded as a Blockbuster at the box office and is widely acclaimed as one of the finest comedy films in Telugu. It was released on 24 January 1992.

Plot
Appa Rao is a bachelor who manages every day by living off the loans he takes from others. He manages to coerce the local MLA Nadendla Anjaiah into promising to repay his debts in exchange for the votes in Anjaiah's favor from the debtors of Appa Rao. One night, he meets a lady constable Subba Lakshmi, who slaps him for trying to protect some rowdies who tried to molest her. They meet again and spar with each other, this time over a lottery ticket for Rs. 10 lakhs, and end up tearing the ticket. The seller refuses to take it back instead advises them to keep the two halves with them so that if they win the lottery, they could share the prize money. As luck would have it, their ticket wins the lottery and Appa Rao fakes a story about his family troubles to retrieve the other half of the ticket from Subba Lakshmi. Though aware of the pretense of Appa Rao, she donates the other half as she learns that the ticket didn't win the lottery and it was mistakenly printed in the newspaper earlier. Appa Rao later realizes the same and confronts her, but she tells him that she sacrificed her ticket as she believed his story. As a result, Appa Rao falls in love with her and overcome by emotion, tries to kiss her, but she slaps him for the second time. Subba Lakshmi also falls in love with Appa Rao.

Appa Rao meets an astrologer Shastri, who foretells him that he would inherit huge sums of money if he married a woman who could slap him thrice. Appa Rao reveals to Shastri about his encounters with Subba Lakshmi and Shastri foretells him that he would marry her. Just as he was about to finish his statement, enter Iron Leg Shastri (Ironleg Sastri), who so influences the prophecy of his brother that whatever his brother foretells, it turns out to be the opposite way. He tells Appa Rao that Subba Lakshmi would die as his brother had intruded into their conversation. However, he tells Appa Rao that he could avoid this bad omen if he married a dying woman. His initial attempts go in vain. Finally, he accidentally meets Ammaji in a temple and convinces her into marrying him with her dying elder daughter, Bangari (Sindhuja). However, his plans turn upside down after marriage after he realizes that he was tricked into this marriage by Ammaji. Appa Rao plans to have a divorce from Bangari, but Ammaji sets a condition that, before taking divorce, he should get her other daughters married. With the help of Subba Lakshmi, whom he manages to convince about his marriage with Bangari, he is able to arrange the marriage of his sisters-in-law at the same time. After the marriages, Ammaji requests Appa Rao to reconsider his decision of getting a divorce, but to no avail. Finally, Subba Lakshmi is revealed to be the eldest daughter of Ammaji and Appa Rao ends up marrying both Subba Lakshmi & Bangari.

Cast

 Rajendra Prasad as Appula Apparao
 Shobana as Subbalakshmi
 Sindhuja as Bangari
 Brahmanandam as Sastry
 Babu Mohan as Nadendla Anjaiah
 Ali as Lottery Ticketer
 Tanikella Bharani as Chilipi Donga
 Mallikarjuna Rao as Tata Rao
 J. V. Somayajulu as Eeswara Sastry
 Suthi Velu as Brahmaji
 Ironleg Sastri as Iron leg Sastri
 Potti Prasad
 Chidatala Appa Rao as "Jyothi Chithra"
 Annapoorna as Mangatayaru
 Ramaprabha as Ammaji 
 Jayalalita as Tata Rao's wife
 Chandrika as Savitri
 Lathasri as Chitti
 Siva Parvathi

Soundtrack 

The soundtrack is composed by Rajan–Nagendra, released by Surya Recording Company.

References

External links
 

1991 films
1991 romantic comedy films
Films shot in Vijayawada
Indian romantic comedy films
Films scored by Rajan–Nagendra
Films directed by E. V. V. Satyanarayana
Films set in Vijayawada
1990s Telugu-language films